Hemiscyllium is a genus of sharks in the family Hemiscylliidae.

Overview
This genus is confined to tropical waters off Australia, Papua New Guinea, and Indonesia, but an individual from this genus, possibly representing an undescribed species, has been photographed at the Seychelles. They have short snouts with the nostrils placed almost at the tip, and well-elevated eyes and supraorbital ridges. The mouth is closer to the tip of the snout than the eyes, and lacks the connecting dermal fold across the chin. The pectoral and pelvic fins are thick and heavily muscular. Either a black hood on the head or a large black spot on the sides of the body is present, though juveniles often are strongly marked with dark spots/bars.

Some species are known as "walking sharks".

In January 2020, marine biologists at the School of Biomedical Sciences at the University of Queensland in Australia announced new findings that provide evidence that genus Hemiscyllium, also known as "walking sharks", was the newest genus of sharks in terms of historical findings on biological evolution.

List of species
Nine recognized species are in this genus:
 Hemiscyllium freycineti (Quoy & Gaimard, 1824) (Indonesian speckled carpetshark)
 Hemiscyllium galei G. R. Allen & Erdmann, 2008 (Cenderwasih epaulette shark)
 Hemiscyllium hallstromi Whitley, 1967 (Papuan epaulette shark)
 Hemiscyllium halmahera G. R. Allen, Erdmann & Dudgeon, 2013 (Halmahera epaulette shark)
 Hemiscyllium henryi G. R. Allen & Erdmann, 2008 (Henry's epaulette shark)
 Hemiscyllium michaeli G. R. Allen & Dudgeon, 2010 (Milne Bay epaulette shark)
 Hemiscyllium ocellatum (Bonnaterre, 1788) (epaulette shark)
 Hemiscyllium strahani Whitley, 1967 (hooded carpetshark)
 Hemiscyllium trispeculare J. Richardson, 1843 (speckled carpetshark)
 Hemiscyllium sp. Not yet described (Seychelles carpetshark)

References

 
Shark genera
Taxa named by Johannes Peter Müller
Taxa named by Friedrich Gustav Jakob Henle
Walking fish